The Ministry of General Machine-Building Industry of the USSR (MOM) (Russian: Министерство общего машиностроения СССР) was a government ministry of the Soviet Union.

The Ministry headquarters was located in Moscow, on Miusskaya Sq. (Миусская пл.) 3.

History
The Ministry of General Machine Building was established by the provisions of the CPSU Central Committee and USSR Council of Ministers no. 126-47 on 2 March 1965, who oversaw all issues related to space exploration in the USSR.

At the beginning the ministry consisted of 55 organizational units - companies, firms and research institutes: in 1966 there were 134, in 1991, 160.

On September 17, 1991, the Ministry was wound up, passing on their duties to the newly established Federal Space Agency Roskosmos (Федеральное космическое агентство - Роскосмос).

List of ministers
Source:
 Sergey Afanasyev (2.3.1965 - 8.4.1983)
 Oleg Baklanov (8.4.1983 - 26.3.1988)
 Vitaly Doguzhiev (26.3.1988 - 17.7.1989)
 Oleg Shushkin (17.7.1989 - 24.12.1991)

See also
Ministry of Medium Machine Building, Soviet ministry of nuclear industry.

References

 
Space program of the Soviet Union